New Era is an unincorporated community in Clackamas County, Oregon, United States. Its post office opened in 1876 and closed in 1940.

Climate
This region experiences warm (but not hot) and dry summers, with no average monthly temperatures above 71.6 °F.  According to the Köppen Climate Classification system, New Era has a warm-summer Mediterranean climate, abbreviated "Csb" on climate maps.

References

Unincorporated communities in Clackamas County, Oregon
1876 establishments in Oregon
Populated places established in 1876
Unincorporated communities in Oregon
Populated places on the Willamette River